Scott Atchison (born July 16, 1962) is a former American racing driver from Bakersfield, California who competed in the CART IndyCar World Series in 1988 and 1989. He made 13 starts his rookie year and finished 20th in series points for Machinists Union Racing. He returned the following year to make 3 mid-summer road course starts for Euromotorsport. His best CART finish was 9th place at Long Beach and Miami his rookie year.  He attempted to qualify for the 1988 Indianapolis 500 but was bumped from the field.

Racing record

SCCA National Championship Runoffs

Formula Super Vee

References

External links

1962 births
Champ Car drivers
Living people
Racing drivers from Bakersfield, California
SCCA National Championship Runoffs winners
SCCA Formula Super Vee drivers
Formula Super Vee Champions

EuroInternational drivers